Henry George Hamlet Hall (24 December 1857 – 13 February 1934) played cricket for Somerset from 1879 to 1887; two of the matches he played for the team were first-class games. He was born at Bedminster, Bristol and died at Southmead, also in Bristol.

Hall, a lower-order batsman and a bowler whose bowling style is unknown, has the distinction of taking the first wicket ever taken by Somerset in an authenticated first-class match when he had Lancashire opening batsman and captain Albert Hornby caught in the match at Old Trafford on 8 June 1882, and he followed it with a catch to dismiss the second Lancashire batsman, Walter Robinson. There were no other successes for Hall in this game: no more catches, wickets or runs when he batted and he then did not play against for Somerset in any first-class fixture for three years. By the time he reappeared for a single game in 1885 against Gloucestershire, whose team included W. G. Grace, he was being played as an opening batsman: to no great effect, as he scored 0 and 2 and Somerset lost very heavily. Though Hall went on to play minor matches for a further 10 years, this was his last first-class cricket game.

References

1857 births
1934 deaths
English cricketers
Somerset cricketers